Thomas E. Rowan
(1842–1901) served as the 21st Mayor of Los Angeles from 1892 until 1894.

References
Chronological Record of Los Angeles City Officials: 1850—1938, Compiled under Direction of Municipal Reference Library City Hall, Los Angeles March 1938 (Reprinted 1966)
 https://web.archive.org/web/20160213052837/http://culturela.org/publicart/mayorsla.pdf

History of Los Angeles
Mayors of Los Angeles
1842 births
1901 deaths